Vato (Spanish "guy") may refer to:

Geography
 Vätö, island in the Norrtälje archipelago
 Vätö Church medieval church in Vätö in Stockholm County, Sweden
 Port Vato village at the south coast of the island of Ambrym in Vanuatu

Entertainment
 "Vato" (song), a song by Snoop Dogg
 "Vato", a song by Dj Mustard (featuring YG, Jeezy and Que)
 "Vatos (The Walking Dead)", an episode of The Walking Dead
 El Vato, a television series based on the life of Mexican singer El Dasa

Other
 Swamini Vato sayings of Gunatitanand Swami
 Vatos Locos, gangs

See also
 Cholo (subculture)